Dariba is a village in Railmagra tehsil   in Rajsamand district  in the state of Rajasthan in India.

Geography
It has an average elevation of 479 metres (1571 feet).

Demographics
 India census, Dariba had a population of 2832. Males constitute 53% of the population and females 47%. Dariba has an average literacy rate of 84%, higher than the national average of 59.5%: male literacy is 89% and, female literacy is 79%. In Dariba, 8% of the population is under 6 years of age. Dariba is an important zinc and lead  mining and smelting region of Rajasthan.

References

Cities and towns in Rajsamand district